WJDM (1530 AM, "Radio Cantico Nuevo") was a radio station licensed to Elizabeth, New Jersey (the seat of Union County, New Jersey), which last broadcast a Spanish language Christian radio format. The station's transmitter was located in nearby Union Township, Union County, New Jersey.

History
The station signed on the air on March 11, 1970 as WELA with the following jingle: (Drumroll) - Announcer: "You've listened to the rest, now listen to the best!" (Chorus - "W-E-L-A, You never heard it so good!") The original format consisted of music, mainly middle-of-the-road (MOR), adult contemporary and rock 'n roll oldies selections, with local news and information.  The station made a name for itself with its coverage of an explosion at the Linden, New Jersey Bayway Refinery just after 11 PM Saturday December 5, 1970, which had area residents fearing for their lives much of the next day.

In order to avoid confusion with WERA Plainfield, New Jersey (1590 kHz), the original call sign was changed in January 1971 to WJDM, with the letters J, D and M standing for the first names of the original owners. WJDM later adopted an ethnic format, reflecting the city's changing demographics, that expanded from Sundays to full-time in the 1990s.

Expanded Band assignment

In 1979, a World Administrative Radio Conference (WARC-79) adopted "Radio Regulation No. 480", which stated that "In Region 2, the use of the band 1605-1705 kHz by stations of the broadcasting service shall be subject to a plan to be established by a regional administrative radio conference..." As a consequence, on June 8, 1988, an ITU-sponsored conference held at Rio de Janeiro, Brazil adopted provisions, effective July 1, 1990, to extend the upper end of the Region 2 AM broadcast band, by adding ten frequencies which spanned from 1610 kHz to 1700 kHz. The agreement provided for a standard transmitter power of 1 kilowatt, which could be increased to 10 kilowatts in cases where it did not result in undue interference.

While the Federal Communications Commission (FCC) was still making U.S. preparations to populate the additional frequencies, known as the AM expanded band, a provision was added to the Communications Act of 1934 in late 1991 which mandated that priority for assignments would be given to existing daytime-only stations that were located in a community with a population over 100,000, and which also did not have any full-time stations. Taking advantage of this provision, on December 8, 1995, WJDM became first station in the country to begin regular broadcasting on the expanded band, assigned to 1660 kHz. On February 1, 1996 Radio AAHS network children's programming debuted on 1660 AM, which lasted until 1997.

Initially, the expanded band station carried the same WJDM call letters as its parent station. On March 17, 1997, the FCC completed the process of determining which stations would be permitted to move to expanded band frequencies, and WJDM was included among the eighty-eight selected stations, now formally authorized to move from 1530 to 1660 kHz. A construction permit for the expanded band station was assigned the call letters WBAH on May 11, 1998, which were changed to WWRU on February 15, 1999. WWRU later changed its community of license to Jersey City, New Jersey.

Later history

The FCC's initial policy was that both the original station and its expanded band counterpart could operate simultaneously for up to five years, after which owners would have to turn in one of the two licenses, depending on whether they preferred the new assignment or elected to remain on the original frequency, although this deadline was extended multiple times. WJDM ceased broadcasting on January 30, 2019, and its license was cancelled April 10, 2020. After the station ceased operations, W248CG became a repeater of WXMC, and now WTHE. The WJDM call letters were later moved to WTHE in Mineola, New York where Cantico Nuevo Ministry, Inc., which provides the Radio Cantico Nuevo programing, owns the station.

References

External links
FCC Station Search Details: DWJDM (Facility ID: 54563)
FCC History Cards for DWJDM (covering 1969-1978 as WELA / WJDM)

JDM
Union County, New Jersey
Radio stations established in 1970
Radio stations disestablished in 2020
1970 establishments in New Jersey
2020 disestablishments in New Jersey
Multicultural Broadcasting stations
Defunct radio stations in the United States
Defunct religious radio stations in the United States
JDM
JDM